James "Jimbo" Lull (born August 2, 1996) is an American professional basketball player for Flyers Wels of the Austrian Basketball Superliga. He played college basketball for San Francisco.

High school career
Lull grew up in Manhattan Beach, California and focused on surfing before turning his attention to basketball. He attended Rolling Hills Preparatory School in San Pedro, California for three years. As a sophomore, Lull averaged 18.8 points and 12.8 rebounds per game, helping the Huskies reach the Southern Section 5A championship game. He averaged 15.4 points, 12.3 rebounds and 3.0 blocks per game as a junior. Lull transferred to New Hampton School for his senior year and also a postgraduate year. He committed to San Francisco in November 2015.

College career
Lull came off the bench for his first two seasons at San Francisco. Following his sophomore season, he improved his conditioning by running up mountains in New Hampshire. As a junior, Lull averaged 8.5 points and 5.3 rebounds per game. On November 30, 2019, Lull scored a career-high 24 points and grabbed 10 rebounds in an 85–75 loss to Hawaii. He averaged 11.9 points and 7.6 rebounds per game as a senior. Lull was named Honorable Mention All-West Coast Conference.

Professional career
Lull signed his first professional contract with Ionikos Nikaias of the Greek Basket League on September 24, 2020. After being tested by the team and appearing in two cup games, he signed with Sloboda Užice of the Basketball League of Serbia. He averaged 7.5 points and 4.5 rebounds per game. On December 2, 2020, Lull signed a one-season contract with Cheshire Phoenix of the British Basketball League (BBL). He averaged 12.8 points, 6.9 rebounds, and 1.0 assist per game. Lull joined the Edmonton Stingers of the Canadian Elite Basketball League in 2021. He averaged 3.5 points and 1.3 rebounds per game in four games. On September 27, 2021, Lull signed with Flyers Wels of the Austrian Basketball Superliga.

Career statistics

College

|-
| style="text-align:left;"| 2016–17
| style="text-align:left;"| San Francisco
| 32 || 6 || 12.5 || .571 || .231 || .727 || 2.4 || .5 || .3 || .3 || 3.6
|-
| style="text-align:left;"| 2017–18
| style="text-align:left;"| San Francisco
| 31 || 1 || 11.0 || .566 || .083 || .656 || 3.0 || .3 || .2 || .6 || 4.3
|-
| style="text-align:left;"| 2018–19
| style="text-align:left;"| San Francisco
| 31 || 29 || 19.2 || .604 || .000 || .729 || 5.3 || .7 || .2 || .5 || 8.5
|-
| style="text-align:left;"| 2019–20
| style="text-align:left;"| San Francisco
| 34 || 34 || 28.1 || .569 || .323 || .755 || 7.6 || 1.1 || .6 || .8 || 11.9
|- class="sortbottom"
| style="text-align:center;" colspan="2"| Career
| 128 || 70 || 17.9 || .579 || .246 || .730 || 4.6 || .6 || .3 || .5 || 7.2

References

External links
San Francisco Dons bio

1996 births
Living people
American expatriate basketball people in Canada
American expatriate basketball people in Greece
American expatriate basketball people in Serbia
American expatriate basketball people in the United Kingdom
American men's basketball players
Basketball League of Serbia players
Basketball players from California
KK Sloboda Užice players
Edmonton Stingers players
San Francisco Dons men's basketball players
Sportspeople from Manhattan Beach, California
Centers (basketball)